Royal Lakes is a village in Macoupin County, Illinois, United States. The population was 167 at the 2020 census, down from 197 in 2010.

Geography
Royal Lakes is located at  (39.1116990, -89.9606600) in Hillyard Township in southern Macoupin County. Royal Lakes lies at the southwestern corner of two intersecting roads, Illinois Route 16 and Illinois Route 159.

Lakes

Three small lakes – Meshach, Shad, and Shadrach – are located within the village of Royal Lakes.
 Meshach Lake is located in the east central portion of Royal Lakes.
 Shadrach Lake is located north of Magnolia Drive and west of North Dogwood Drive.
Shad Lake is an impoundment on Coop Branch, a northwest-flowing tributary of Macoupin Creek, while Meshach and Shadrach Lakes are built on separate tributaries of Coop Branch. The entire community is within the Illinois River watershed.

History
The site that would eventually become Royal Lakes was purchased by a Chicago developer in 1956. The  tract was to be developed as a resort-style community. Royal Lakes was marketed as an affordable resort location in a rural setting. The community was heavily promoted in the predominantly African American neighborhoods of St. Louis and East St. Louis. In 1957, the first families moved into Royal Lakes. A community church was organized in 1961, and the congregation moved into a permanent building seven years later.

Due to Royal Lakes' status as a "resort" area, a lack of zoning regulations meant that there had been no provisions for the developer to provide basic infrastructure. With no road maintenance, water supply, or proper sewage disposal, the overall quality of life for residents of the community deteriorated. By the early 1970s, residents agreed that the only way to improve conditions in the community was through incorporation. An incorporation election was held in October 1972. Of the 98 votes cast, 89 were in favor of incorporation and 9 opposed. Royal Lakes officially became the Village of Royal Lakes.

The village's first mayor, Thomas J. Stoddard, and other members of the municipal government took office in April 1973.

Demographics

As of the census of 2000, there were 190 people, 80 households, and 46 families residing in the village. The racial makeup of the village was 15.79% White, 80.53% African American, 0.53% Native American, 1.05% from other races, and 2.11% from two or more races. Hispanic or Latino of any race were 1.05% of the population.

There were 80 households, out of which 26.3% had children under the age of 18 living with them, 42.5% were married couples living together, 15.0% had a female householder with no husband present, and 42.5% were non-families. 40.0% of all households were made up of individuals, and 22.5% had someone living alone who was 65 years of age or older. The average household size was 2.38 and the average family size was 3.26.

In the village, the population was spread out, with 30.5% under the age of 18, 5.3% from 18 to 24, 21.6% from 25 to 44, 21.6% from 45 to 64, and 21.1% who were 65 years of age or older. The median age was 39 years. For every 100 females, there were 97.9 males. For every 100 females age 18 and over, there were 76.0 males.

The median income for a household in the village was $17,708, and the median income for a family was $21,042. Males had a median income of $41,667 versus $15,000 for females. The per capita income for the village was $10,049. About 19.1% of families and 27.3% of the population were below the poverty line, including 32.7% of those under the age of eighteen and 27.8% of those 65 or over.

Education
Public education in the village of Royal Lakes is provided by two school districts. The portion of Royal Lakes lying east of Julian Avenue is served by Bunker Hill Community Unit School District 8. Areas west of Julian Avenue are served by Southwestern Community Unit School District 9.

References

Populated places established in 1957
Villages in Macoupin County, Illinois
Villages in Illinois